Sailing at the 2018 Asian Games was held at the Ancol Beach Marina, Jakarta, Indonesia. It was held from 24 to 31 August 2018.

Schedule

Medalists

Men

Women

Mixed

Medal table

Participating nations
A total of 145 athletes from 20 nations competed in sailing at the 2018 Asian Games:

References

External links
Sailing at the 2018 Asian Games
Official Result Book – Sailing

 
2018 Asian Games events
2018
Sailing competitions in Indonesia
2018 in sailing